Kahak County is in Qom province, Iran. The capital of the county is the city of Kahak. At the 2006 census, the region's population (as Nofel Loshato District of Qom County) was 14,621 in 4,194 households. The district had been named after Neauphle-le-Château, where Ayatollah Khomeini spent his exile in France. The following census in 2011 counted 15,235 people in 4,662 households. At the 2016 census, the district's population was 20,588 in 6,492 households. It was separated from the county on 10 May 2021 to become Kahak County.

Administrative divisions

The population history of Kahak County's administrative divisions (as a district of Qom County) over three consecutive censuses is shown in the following table.

References

Counties of Qom Province